Bactrocythara haullevillei is a species of sea snail, a marine gastropod mollusk in the family Mangeliidae.

Subspecies: Bactrocythara haullevillei albida  (P. Dautzenberg, 1912)

Description
The length of the shell attains 5 mm.

Distribution
This marine species occurs off Guinea, West Africa, and off the estuary of the Congo river.

References

 Dautzenberg P. (1912) Mission Gruvel sur la côte occidentale d'Afrique (1909–1910): Mollusques marins. Annales de l'Institut Océanographique, Paris, (Nouvelle Série) 5(3): 1–111, pl. 1–3.

External links
 Biolib.cz : Image of Bactrocythara haullevillei
  Bouchet P., Kantor Yu.I., Sysoev A. & Puillandre N. (2011) A new operational classification of the Conoidea. Journal of Molluscan Studies 77: 273–308. 
  Tucker, J.K. 2004 Catalog of recent and fossil turrids (Mollusca: Gastropoda). Zootaxa 682:1–1295
 MNHN, Paris: syntype

haullevillei